Jerry Mamberg (May 3, 1953 – August 4, 2014), better known as Jake Hooker or Jake Hooker Richards, was a musician, best known as the guitarist for the rock/pop band Arrows.

Life
Hooker was born in Haifa, Israel, but his family moved to the United States when he was a child. Hooker himself moved to England in the 1970s.
Hooker joined forces with his friend Alan Merrill, already a star in Japan, to found the band Streak in 1972, which evolved into the Arrows. The band had several hit records produced by Mickie Most. Alan Merrill wrote the song "I Love Rock 'n' Roll" for the Arrows, giving a co-writer credit to Hooker by way of settling a debt. It was a response to The Rolling Stones' "It's Only Rock 'n Roll (But I Like It)". The song, recorded in 1975 and originally relegated by Most to a b-side, has gone on to become a rock classic. The Arrows broke ground by hosting their own weekly TV series, Arrows, which showcased many top glam rock acts, on the UK Granada ITV network.

Hooker married actress/singer Lorna Luft in London on Valentine's Day 1977. Hooker retired as a musician in 1978 when the Arrows disbanded, moving to Los Angeles to manage Luft. Their marriage ended in divorce, following which he continued to reside in Los Angeles, working as a publisher, producer, manager, and entrepreneur, until his death.

Hooker died in Malibu on August 4, 2014, aged 61.

Family
Hooker and Luft were divorced in 1993. They had two children together, a son Jesse (b. April 1984) and a daughter Vanessa (b. September 1990).

References

External links
 Hook Entertainment

1953 births
2014 deaths
People from Haifa
American rock guitarists
American male guitarists
Israeli emigrants to the United States
20th-century American guitarists
20th-century American male musicians